The Search for Maggie Ward is a 1991 novel by Andrew Greeley which details the quest of one man to find his bride, Maggie Ward, who has inexplicably vanished from their new home in a remote Arizona town.

Reception
Reviewing the book, Michael A. Acquaviva described it as "on balance, another nice Andrew Greeley 
romantic story".

References

1991 American novels
American mystery novels
Ghost novels
Novels set in Arizona
Warner Books books